Alliance is a town in Pamlico County, North Carolina, United States. Its name is derived from the Farmers Alliance Movement from around 1874, two years after Pamlico was founded. Alliance was incorporated in 1965. The majority of land in Alliance is farmland. The population was 776 at the 2010 census. It is part of the New Bern, North Carolina Micropolitan Statistical Area.

Geography

Demographics

2020 census

As of the 2020 United States census, there were 733 people, 340 households, and 216 families residing in the town.

2000 census
As of the census of 2000, there were 781 people, 288 households, and 201 families residing in the town. The population density was 389.5 people per square mile (150.0/km2). There were 304 housing units at an average density of 151.6 per square mile (58.4/km2). The racial makeup of the town was 79.64% White, 17.67% African American, 1.15% Native American, 0.51% Asian, 0.26% from other races, and 0.77% from two or more races. Hispanic or Latino people of any race were 0.77% of the population.

There were 288 households, out of which 26.4% had children under the age of 18 living with them, 55.6% were married couples living together, 10.8% had a female householder with no husband present, and 30.2% were non-families. 27.1% of all households were made up of individuals, and 11.1% had someone living alone who was 65 years of age or older. The average household size was 2.40 and the average family size was 2.93.

In the town, the population was spread out, with 22.5% under the age of 18, 5.5% from 18 to 24, 24.5% from 25 to 44, 22.8% from 45 to 64, and 24.7% who were 65 years of age or older. The median age was 43 years. For every 100 females, there were 83.3 males. For every 100 females age 18 and over, there were 77.4 males.

The median income for a household in the town was $26,719, and the median income for a family was $35,250. Males had a median income of $33,125 versus $22,438 for females. The per capita income for the town was $15,951. About 12.1% of families and 17.3% of the population were below the poverty line, including 28.4% of those under age 18 and 16.8% of those age 65 or over.

References

External links
 Pamlico Today – online newspaper of the Pamlico Sound

Towns in North Carolina
Towns in Pamlico County, North Carolina
New Bern micropolitan area